Edith Huntington Jones "Kit" Dobelle (born in 1944) served as United States Chief of Protocol from November 3, 1978 to September 26, 1979 under president Jimmy Carter. Her husband, Evan Dobelle, served as Chief of Protocol before her. She was succeeded by Abelardo L. Valdez.

From 1979-1981, Dobelle served as Chief of Staff to First Lady Rosalynn Carter.

References

External link

Living people
1944 births
Chiefs of Protocol of the United States
Carter administration personnel